Persian Lessons is a 2020 German-Russian-Belarusian war drama film directed by Vadim Perelman. The film was partially inspired by the short story Erfindung einer Sprache by German writer Wolfgang Kohlhaase.

It was selected as the Belarusian entry for the Best International Feature Film at the 93rd Academy Awards. However, the film was disqualified by the Academy, due to the majority of individuals involved in making the film not coming from Belarus.

Plot
To prevent being shot, Jewish Frenchman Gilles tells German soldiers he is Persian. They bring him to a concentration camp where Koch, the deputy commandant, asks to be taught Farsi, the Persian language. Calling himself Reza, he works for Koch in the kitchen, and invents "Persian" words to fool Koch and stay alive.

Koch hopes to learn 2,000 words in two years. He intends to visit Tehran after the war to start a restaurant. Section Leader Max warns Koch that Reza is lying about being Persian.

Koch tests Reza by giving him 40 words to translate, but no pencil. Reza must come to his office later and Koch will write them down. This task seems impossible, so Reza escapes the camp when taking out slop from the kitchen, and encounters a French man in a wood who advises him to return, which he does. Koch orders Reza to neatly copy in a ledger a list of newly arrived prisoners, omitting crossed out names as those died en route to the camp. Reza sees a way of using the ledger as a mnemonic to remember the 40 invented "Persian" words, using sections of the names of the dead. This works: he can recite all 40 words without the list as he still has the ledger in front of him.

Reza is beaten by Koch when he mistakenly gives the same word two meanings. Reza is sent to hard labour breaking rocks. Reza collapses and recovers in the camp hospital.

Other officers complain of Koch's behaviour and want Elsa, one of the female guards, reinstated as book-keeper. Koch must explain his behaviour to the commandant. He says he knows who is spreading rumours that the commandant has a small penis. While Reza is sent to labour at a farm, Elsa does the book-keeping. Suspecting her of the small-penis rumours, the commandant orders Elsa to the Russian front.

Reza takes food to a deaf Italian man he saw beaten earlier. The man's grateful brother says he will protect Reza. Max discovers a prisoner who may reveal Reza's falsehood, but the Italian brother kills this man. Max kills Reza's protector.

Koch learns that Reza has joined a consignment of prisoners walking to the train station. Koch rushes to rescue him. But the American Army is approaching the camp, and the commandant orders his officers to destroy all records and execute the remaining prisoners. After Koch marches Reza out of the camp, Max tells the commandant who takes no interest.

Koch frees Reza, intending to travel alone. In Tehran, Iranian customs officials do not understand Koch's speech and he is arrested.

Escaping to the American lines, Gilles is questioned about the concentration camp. He recites to American officers the full names of 2,840 people—the mnemonic names from the ledger.

Cast
 Nahuel Pérez Biscayart as Gilles/Reza
 Lars Eidinger as Deputy Commandant Klaus Koch
 Jonas Nay as Section Leader Max Beyer
 David Schütter as Section Leader Paul
 Alexander Beyer as Camp Commandant
 Andreas Hofer as Adjutant von Dewitz
 Leonie Benesch as Elsa Strumfp
 Giuseppe Schillaci as Marco Rossi

Production
The script of the film was first written in Russian, and then translated into English and eventually German. The fake version of Persian spoken in the film was invented by a Russian philologist at Moscow State University, who based the vocabulary on the real names of documented victims of the Holocaust.

Release
Persian Lessons premiered at the Berlin International Film Festival on 22 February 2020. In December 2020, Russia submitted the film to the 78th annual Golden Globes competition. The film was released in China on 19 March 2021.

Accolades

See also
 List of submissions to the 93rd Academy Awards for Best International Feature Film
 List of Belarusian submissions for the Academy Award for Best International Feature Film

References

External links
 

2020 films
2020 war drama films
Russian war drama films
German war drama films
Belarusian war films
Russian World War II films 
Belarusian World War II films
2020s German-language films
Fictional-language films
Films directed by Vadim Perelman
Films about language
Films about interpreting and translation
Films set in 1942
Films set in France
Holocaust films
Films based on short fiction
Constructed languages